Holeys (formerly Holey Soles) is a privately held Canadian company that manufactures and distributes injection foam molded footwear and other lifestyle products made from ethylene-vinyl acetate, a technically advanced, closed cell polymer. Holeys was named the #1 Fastest Growing Company in Canada by the Profit Hot 50 list for 2006, with a two-year growth of 6,500%. Joyce Groote, CEO & President, was a finalist in the 2007 Ernst and Young Entrepreneur of the Year Awards and has been profiled in numerous business journals for her success in growing the business to an international level.

Company history

Holeys began as a small company operating out of a residential garage in Vancouver in 2002.  The company was started by Groote’s neighbour, a serial entrepreneur who successfully introduced the original foam shoes into Vancouver, British Columbia, Canada.  In early 2004, Groote was approached to help grow the company to the next stage.  Groote, a former geneticist, had moved to Vancouver to work with small start up companies in the life science sector.  She saw a strong potential for growth in Holeys and became a partner and an Angel Investor. In late 2004, she purchased the company.  At this time, Holeys had annual revenues of just under $60,000. The company has since grown exponentially to become a multimillion-dollar company that sells their shoes in more than 40 countries worldwide.

Charitable Donations

Holeys has become known for its donations to charitable organizations around the world. In 2007, Holeys partnered with Soles4Souls to provide 100,000 pairs of shoes worldwide to people in need. This was the largest single donation in history for Soles4Souls. Holeys has also donated funds to aid the victims of the Dec. 24, 2004 tsunami in Thailand, and most recently donated 260,000 worth of shoes to those affected by Hurricane Katrina in the United States of America. In addition to their international humanitarian efforts, Holeys contributes to North American children's charities including First Steps Canada.

References

External links
 Holeys official website

Clothing companies of Canada